Chartered in 1883, the Wrightsville and Tennille Railroad was founded to build a line from a connection with the Central of Georgia Railroad at Tennille, GA to Wrightsville, GA. In 1886, the W&T merged with the Dublin and Wrightsville Railroad and gained a through line to Dublin, GA. Ten years later the line was extended to Hawkinsville, GA through a purchase of a branch of the Oconee and Western Railroad. Then in 1907, the W&T acquired the Dublin and Southwestern Railroad which ran from Dublin to Eastman, GA. Service west of Dublin ended in 1941 through abandonment of two branch lines. The remainder of the W&T was merged into the Central of Georgia on June 1, 1971. The line currently serves Norfolk Southern as a storage track for excess autoracks due to the slow down in the U.S auto business. The former Wrightsville & Tennille headquarters is still intact as a private residence in Tennille, Georgia.

References

Defunct Georgia (U.S. state) railroads
Predecessors of the Central of Georgia Railway
Railway companies established in 1883
Railway companies disestablished in 1971